Cyril Partridge (2 August 1896 – 23 February 1945) was an English cricketer.  Partridge was a right-handed batsman.  He was born at Higham Ferrers, Northamptonshire.

Partridge made a single first-class appearance for Northamptonshire against Lancashire at Old Trafford in the 1921 County Championship.  In Northamptonshire's first-innings he was dismissed for a single run by Dick Tyldesley, while in their second-innings he was dismissed by Harry Dean for a duck.

He died at Shillington, Bedfordshire on 23 February 1945.

References

External links
Cyril Partridge at ESPNcricinfo
Cyril Partridge at CricketArchive

1896 births
1945 deaths
People from Higham Ferrers
English cricketers
Northamptonshire cricketers